Belaverjan (also Romanized as Belāverjān, Balāvarjān, and Belāvarjān; also known as Balādarjān) is a village in Hamzehlu Rural District, in the Central District of Khomeyn County, Markazi Province, Iran. At the 2006 census, its population was 295, in 95 families.

References 

Populated places in Khomeyn County